Pratap Rajadhyaksha is an American bridge player.

Bridge accomplishments

Wins

 North American Bridge Championships (4)
 Blue Ribbon Pairs (1) 2007 
 Reisinger (1) 2002 
 Roth Open Swiss Teams (1) 2011 
 Wernher Open Pairs (1) 2000

Runners-up

 North American Bridge Championships (4)
 North American Pairs (1) 1991 
 Grand National Teams (1) 1982 
 Blue Ribbon Pairs (1) 2001 
 Roth Open Swiss Teams (1) 2005

Notes

American contract bridge players
Living people
Year of birth missing (living people)